"Good Morning" is the first official single from Chamillionaire's cancelled studio album, Venom. It was produced by DJ Frank E and was released digitally on October 13, 2009. The single debuted and peaked at number 40 on the Billboard Hot 100 chart, and a video for the single was released on November 10, 2009. The instrumentals for "Good Morning" contains samples from the song "Free Fallin'" by Tom Petty. Fellow Houston rapper Pimp C also sampled "Free Fallin'" on his post-incarceration album Pimpalation.

Track listing
Digital Single

Chart positions

References

2009 songs
2009 singles
Chamillionaire songs
Song recordings produced by DJ Frank E
Songs written by Chamillionaire
Songs written by DJ Frank E
Universal Republic Records singles
Songs written by Tom Petty
Songs written by Jeff Lynne
Pop-rap songs